A total lunar eclipse occurred on 26 May 2021. A lunar eclipse occurs when the Moon moves into the Earth's shadow. This can occur only when the Sun, Earth, and Moon are exactly or very closely aligned (in syzygy) with Earth between the other two, which can only happen at a full moon. The eclipsed moon appeared as a faint red disk in the sky due to a small amount of light being refracted through the earth's atmosphere; this appearance gives a lunar eclipse its nickname of a Blood Moon.

It was the first total lunar eclipse since the January 2019 lunar eclipse, and the first in a series of an almost tetrad (with four consecutive total or deep partial lunar eclipses). The next total eclipse occurred in May 2022. The event took place near lunar perigee; as a result, this supermoon was referred to in US media coverage as a "super flower blood moon", and elsewhere as a "super blood moon".

It was followed two weeks later by an annular solar eclipse on 10 June 2021 over the northern polar regions of Earth.

This lunar eclipse was the first of an almost tetrad, the others being 19 Nov 2021 (P), 16 May 2022 (T) and 08 Nov 2022 (T).

Visibility
The total lunar eclipse was visible over the Pacific Ocean, Oceania, and Antarctica in its entirety. Observers located in southern and eastern Asia saw the eclipse at moonrise, whilst observers located in western North America and western South America saw the eclipse at moonset.

Contact timing 
Local times are recomputed here for the time zones of the areas where the eclipse was visible:

Observations

Related eclipses

Eclipses of 2021 
 A total lunar eclipse on 26 May
 An annular solar eclipse on 10 June
 A partial lunar eclipse on 19 November
 A total solar eclipse on 4 December

Lunar year series

Saros series
This eclipse was the 55th eclipse and final total eclipse of Saros cycle 121.

Metonic series
First eclipse: May 26, 2002
Second eclipse: May 26, 2021.
Third eclipse: May 26, 2040.
Fourth eclipse: May 27, 2059.

Tzolkinex 
 Preceded: Lunar eclipse of April 15, 2014
 Followed: Lunar eclipse of July 6, 2028

Half-Saros cycle
A lunar eclipse will be preceded and followed by solar eclipses by 9 years and 5.5 days (a half saros). This lunar eclipse is related to two annular solar eclipses of Solar Saros 128.

See also
List of lunar eclipses and List of 21st-century lunar eclipses

Notes

References

2021-05
2021-05
2021 in science
May 2021 events